The 1934 Haskell Indians football team was an American football that represented the Haskell Institute—now known as Haskell Indian Nations University—as an independent during the 1934 college football season. Led by Gus Welch in his second and final year as head coach, Haskell compiled a record of 3–6–1. Tackle Fred "Jug" Miles was the team captain.

Schedule

References

Haskell
Haskell Indian Nations Fighting Indians football seasons
Haskell Indians football